Al Este Bodega y Viñedos is a winery in Médanos, Buenos Aires Province, Argentina. The project has been developed under the direction of the Italian wine maker Alberto Antonini.

In its first submission to a wine contest, Al Este was awarded a silver medal in the White Wine category in the 2009 Decanter World Wine Awards, the world's largest wine contest, celebrated in London.  Al Este's award-winning wine is recommended by Decanter in sixth position as one of the top chardonnays in 2009.

History 
In the early 20th century several European immigrants arrived to Médanos and brought the wine making tradition with them. Although at some point a multitude of small growers planted a combined surface of approximately 200 hectares of vineyards, they were unable to successfully complete the wine making process given lack of scale, inadequate technology and the country's ups and downs which led to their disappearance.

The Médanos terroir, that had traditionally been dedicated to garlic and pastures, has striking similarities to Bordeaux, France in terms of its soil, weather conditions and proximity to the sea. More recently, the idea of starting a wine project in Médanos got reignited as a result of a trip to France which provided renewed confidence in the terroir's  potential.

In 2000, a hectare and a half was planted on an experimental basis with nine grape varietals.  In a second stage, after analyzing the obtained quality standards for each grape variety at the Instituto Nacional de Tecnología Agropecuaria (INTA), 25 additional hectares were planted mainly with six varietals.

Grape varieties 
Al Este produces several varietals.

Red: Malbec, Cabernet Sauvignon, Merlot, Tannat, Cabernet Franc

White: Chardonnay, Sauvignon blanc

Vineyards and winery 
The vineyards are located at 39 degrees latitude south, where the Patagonia and Pampa converge, approximately 40 km from the Atlantic Ocean.   Windy springs help develop thicker skins that contribute to the intense color of these wines.  
The geological foundation of the Médanos region is limestone, leading to a soil structure that is heavy in calcium.  The soil has high sand content, which doesn't retain as much humidity, and as a consequence this terroir absorbs and liberates heat faster creating a large temperature range which favors the development and growth of grapes.

Topography:  Flatland with meadows (médanos)

Soil type: Sandy over a calcareous plate

Irrigation system:  Dripping

Frost protection: Water spraying by aspersion

Harvesting and grape selection: Manual

Plant support system: Espalier

The winery produces red and white wines, which are aged in French and American oak and in bottles in its underground cellars.  It is the first company to grow, produce and sell premium wines in the Buenos Aires Province.

Domaine Al Este
Domaine Al Este is a 290 hectares terroir located in Médanos, Buenos Aires Province, Argentina. Developed by Al Este, it was the result of a careful analysis and screening of land in this new terroir that was particularly apt for the growth of vineyards dedicated to the production of premium wines.

The vineyards are located at 39 degrees latitude south, where the Patagonia and Pampa converge, approximately 40 km from the Atlantic Ocean.

Topography:  Flatland with meadows (médanos)

Soil type: Sandy over a calcareous plate

Weather: Oceanic influence, with a windy Spring

Rainfall: 500mm per year

See also
Medanos (appellation)
Buenos Aires wines

References

External links 
 Avec des nouvelles régions l’Argentine pourrait convoquer des nouveaux investisseurs 
Lanzarán vinos producidos al sur de Buenos Aires 
El mapa vitivinícola se extiende por la Provincia de Buenos Aires 

Wineries of Argentina
Buenos Aires Province